Predejane is a village in Serbia. It is situated in the Leskovac municipality, in the Jablanica District. The population of the village is 1,088 people (2011 census).

References 

Populated places in Jablanica District
Serbia geography articles needing translation from French Wikipedia